Roy Graham  may refer to:

 Roy Graham (baseball) (1895–1933), American Major League Baseball player
 Royal Theodore Graham (1887–1965), Liberal party member of the Canadian House of Commons

See also
 Rory Graham (born 1985), an English singer and songwriter, known professionally as Rag'n'Bone Man